Brian Lewis Jennings (born October 14, 1976) is a former American football long snapper and tight end for the San Francisco 49ers of the National Football League (NFL). He played college football for Arizona State University, and was picked by the 49ers in the seventh round of the 2000 NFL Draft.  He is a two-time Pro Bowl selection, having been chosen for the 2004 and 2012 Pro Bowls as a special teams player.  He is the founder of Jennings 1-4-1, dedicated to developing the skill of long snapping.

Early years
Jennings was born in Mesa, Arizona.  At Red Mountain High School in Mesa, he lettered in football, basketball, and track. As a senior, he was the team captain of the football team and was an all-region honorable mention as a tight end.

College career
Jennings attended Arizona State University, where he played in 32 games as a tight end and long snapper for the Arizona State Sun Devils football team.  He finished his college career with four receptions, one touchdown and nine tackles.

NFL career
Jennings played his entire career as the starting long snapper for the San Francisco 49ers, a role he filled for the team for thirteen seasons.

In 2003, Jennings signed an offer sheet as a restricted free agent with the Detroit Lions.  The 49ers matched the offer, and ultimately signed Jennings to a long-term deal.

In 2011, Jennings and Amendment M started Jennings 1-4-1, a long snapping camp for players of all ages. The first camp took place on July 16 at Spartan Stadium in San Jose, California.

Jennings was selected to his second Pro Bowl following the 2011 season.  He had previously been named to the Pro Bowl following the 2003 season.

At the end of the 2012 season, Jennings and the 49ers appeared in Super Bowl XLVII. In the game, he contributed on special teams, but the 49ers fell to the Baltimore Ravens by a score of 34–31.

Jennings was released by the 49ers prior to the start of the 2013 NFL season.

Post football career
Jennings is a regular on KNBR radio, due to his lively personality and intelligently comedic commentary. Jennings has also appeared on the Point After with Mark Ibanez doing post-game commentary on KTVU.

He also has a very peculiar diet, eschewing poultry and pork, largely subsisting on a strict whole grain and beef diet.

References

External links
NFL Profile
ESPN Profile
San Francisco 49ers bio
Brianjennings.com

1976 births
Living people
American football long snappers
American football tight ends
Arizona State Sun Devils football players
National Conference Pro Bowl players
Players of American football from Arizona
San Francisco 49ers players
Sportspeople from Mesa, Arizona